Jewitt is a surname. Notable people with the surname include:

 Arthur Jewitt (1772–1852), English topographer
 David C. Jewitt, astronomer
 Edward Holmes Jewitt (1849–1929), artist
 John R. Jewitt
 Lee Jewitt
 Llewellynn Jewitt
 Orlando Jewitt

See also

 6434 Jewitt, asteroid
 Jewett (disambiguation)